The Yotvata Hai-Bar Nature Reserve is a  breeding and reacclimation center administered by the Israel Nature Reserves & National Parks Authority, situated in the Southern Arava near Yotvata.

The Yotvata Hai-Bar is the desert counterpart of the Carmel Hai-Bar Nature Reserve which operates in the country's Northern Mediterranean forest.

Endangered and locally extinct animals mentioned in the Bible are bred here for possible reintroduction to the Negev desert. The Asian wild ass has already been reintroduced in the Makhtesh Ramon area of the wild. In addition the park has some rare desert animals, which are not native to Israel, like the scimitar oryx and the North African ostrich.

Some of the species bred here are:

Arabian oryx (Oryx leucoryx)
Scimitar oryx (Oryx dammah)
Red-necked ostrich (Struthio camelus camelus)
Addax (Addax nasomaculatus)
Asian wild ass (hybrids of Equus hemionus kulan and Equus hemionus onager)
Somali wild ass (Equus africanus somaliensis)
Caracal (Caracal caracal schmitzi)
Arabian sand cat (Felis margarita harrisoni)
Arabian leopard (Panthera pardus nimr) 
South African cheetah  (Acinonyx jubatus jubatus)
Arabian wolf (Canis lupus arabs)
Dorcas gazelle (Gazella dorcas)
Griffon vulture (Gyps fulvus)
Nubian ibex (Capra nubiana)
Persian leopard (Panthera pardus ciscaucasica)
Striped hyena (Hyaena hyaena)

External links

 Yotvata Hai-Bar on the website of the Israel Nature and Parks Authority
 Photos and videos from Hai-Bar Yotvata, Flickr 
 Yotvata Hai Bar Image Gallery

Nature reserves in Israel
Protected areas of Southern District (Israel)